BR-070 is a federal highway of Brazil. The 1315 kilometre road connects Brasilia to Porto Corixó, Cáceres, Mato Grosso.

Duplication 
BR-070 is duplicated in the 52 km between Brasilia and Águas Lindas de Goiás.

At the end of 2018, the duplication of the GO-070 motorway was completed, in the section between Goiânia and the city of Goiás, which totaled approximately 150 kilometers. The section between the cities of Itaberaí and Goiás is on BR-070.

References 

Federal highways in Brazil